Zauryad-praporshchik was the highest Russian non-commissioned officer (NCO) rank in the Imperial Army from 1909 until 1917. The utilization of this particular rank was limited to wartimes only.

 Rank insignia Zauryad-praporshchik

See also
History of Russian military ranks
Ranks and rank insignia of the Imperial Russian Army until 1917

Equivalent 
Army (infantry, artillery, and cavalry) 
Zauryad-praporshchik (зауряд-прапорщик)
Navy
Starshy bootsmann (cтарший боцман)

See also
History of Russian military ranks
Ranks and rank insignia of the Imperial Russian Army until 1917

References 

Military ranks of Russia